Korkin Dor is a rural locality (a village) in Gorodetskoye Rural Settlement, Kichmengsko-Gorodetsky District, Vologda Oblast, Russia. The population was 14 as of 2002.

Geography 
Korkin Dor is located 35 km southwest of Kichmengsky Gorodok (the district's administrative centre) by road. Dolmatovo is the nearest rural locality.

References 

Rural localities in Kichmengsko-Gorodetsky District